Masjid Jamek Al-Amaniah is a mosque in Selayang, Selangor, Malaysia. It is located in Taman Amaniah, in the proximity of Batu Caves.

See also
 Islam in Malaysia
 GoogleMaps StreetView of Masjid Al-Amaniah, Gombak, Selangor.

References

Gombak District
Amaniah